Dimmock is a surname. Notable people with the surname include:

Dimmock, West Virginia
Arthur Dimmock MBE D.Arts (1918–2007), English writer on deaf matters
Charlie Dimmock (born 1966), English gardening expert and presenter
Dimmock v Secretary of State for Education and Skills, case concerning the use of Al Gore's documentary An Inconvenient Truth
Haydn Dimmock
Jessica Dimmock (born 1978), documentary photojournalist based in New York City
Jimmy Dimmock (1900–1972), footballer who scored the winning goal for Tottenham Hotspur in the 1921 FA Cup Final
Peter Dimmock (1920–2015), pioneering sports broadcaster of British television during its formative years in the 1950s

See also
Dimock (disambiguation)
Camden Town Murder (murder victim's surname)